West Africa Senior High School (WASS) is a second-cycle institution located at Adenta in the Greater Accra Region of Ghana. The school is a government assisted, mixed day and non-denominational institution providing a three-year senior high school education. The school was founded in 1946 by Rev. J. C. Tettey and Emmanuel Addo.

History
The school started in Tudu as the West Africa College of Commerce in 1946. In 1954, the school was absorbed into the public system as a Government-Assisted school.

Enrollment
West Africa Senior High School has a total students population of 1639 of which 49% are girls and 51% are boys.

Alumni 
 Kirani Ayat, rapper, singer and producer;
 Pearl Akanya Ofori of CitiFM;

See also 
T. Q. Armar (former headmaster)

References

Schools in Ghana
Greater Accra Region
Educational institutions established in 1946
1946 establishments in Gold Coast (British colony)